Sochi Thermal Power Plant is a power station in Sochi, Russia. It is part of the infrastructure constructed or improved for the 2014 Winter Olympics which will be held in the city.

History
The first two generation units with a total capacity of 78  MW were launched in December 2004. After announcement in 2007 that Sochi will host 2014 Winter Olympics, the decision was taken to build the second stage of the plant, and two more units were launched in December 2009.

References

External links

Energy infrastructure completed in 2004
Energy infrastructure completed in 2009
Natural gas-fired power stations in Russia
Cogeneration power stations in Russia
2014 Winter Olympics